Lock Me Up, Tie Him Down is a 2014 Chinese film directed by Jeffrey Lau.

Cast
He Jiong
Vivian Hsu
Wang Xuebing
Jiang Mengjie
Kara Hui
Frankie Chan
Cai Xukun

Reception
The film grossed US$4.6 million in China.

References

Films directed by Jeffrey Lau
2010s comedy thriller films
Chinese comedy thriller films